Napialus kulingi is a moth of the family Hepialidae. It is endemic to China.

References

Moths described in 1940
Hepialidae